Cultana refers to various entities in an area of northeastern Eyre Peninsula in South Australia. These include:
 Hundred of Cultana cadastral area
 Cultana, South Australia bounded locality
 Cultana Training Area used by the Australian Army